Yoon Jung-soo is a South Korean comedian.

Variety show

Awards and nominations

References

Living people
South Korean male comedians
Year of birth missing (living people)